Claudio Michele Rizzi (born 13 April 1988) is a German professional footballer who plays as a midfielder for VfL Wolfsburg II.

Personal life
Born in Germany, Rizzi is of Italian descent.

References

External links
 

1988 births
Living people
Footballers from Stuttgart
German footballers
German sportspeople of Italian descent
Association football midfielders
Stuttgarter Kickers players
SG Sonnenhof Großaspach players
SC Preußen Münster players
3. Liga players